is a system tool available on some Unix-like operating systems. When invoked with an additional executable command-line argument,  makes it possible to print out the system calls made by and the signals received by this executable command-line argument. As of version IEEE Std 1003.1-2008,  is not part of the Single UNIX Specification (POSIX).

The  command was originally developed by Roger Faulkner and Ron Gomes as part of the development of Procfs for System V Release 4.  While several names were considered, “” was chosen for being non-ambiguous and easily pronounceable, with multiple meanings, including as an abbreviation for TRace Unix Syscalls and Signals or in the sense of “If your program doesn’t work, put it in a truss.”

See also
 ktrace
 strace

References

External links
 FreeBSD truss man page
 Solaris truss man page
 UnixWare truss man page

Unix programming tools